Daphne mucronata is a shrub, of the family Thymelaeaceae.  It is native to Pakistan, specifically Western Pakistan and areas in trans-Indus.

Description
The shrub is evergreen, and grows to 2.5 m tall. Its slender branches are pale green. It is often found near river banks at around 800–3000 m in altitude.

The leaves contain poisonous properties that are not potent towards goats and the bark can be used to heal bone diseases and for washing hair. The fruits it bears are edible and can be used as a dye.

References

mucronata